Mariëndijk is a hamlet in the Dutch province of South Holland which lies on the border of Honselersdijk and the grounds of the former Paleis Honselersdijk Huis Honselaarsdijk. 

Today, the hamlet is a part of the municipality of the Westland.

Mariëndijk is home to the pan European NGO, The Widow's Foundation, a philanthropic network supporting widows with multilingual and multidisciplinary expertise in medicine, law and finance.

In 2001, Mariëndijk had 173 inhabitants.

References

Populated places in South Holland